New York: A Documentary Film is an eight-part, 17½ hour, American documentary film on the history of New York City. It was directed by Ric Burns and originally aired in the U.S. on PBS. The film was a production of Steeplechase Films in association with WGBH Boston, Thirteen/WNET, and The New-York Historical Society.

The series was written by Burns and James Sanders and produced by Burns's company, Steeplechase Films. Several noted New York City historians, including Mike Wallace, Kenneth T. Jackson, David Levering Lewis and Robert Caro participated in the making of the series as consultants, and appeared on camera. It was narrated by David Ogden Stiers.

Other notable figures who appeared in the series include Rudolph Giuliani (then the mayor of New York City during episodes 1-7), former mayor Ed Koch, former New York governor Mario Cuomo, former U.S. Senator Daniel Patrick Moynihan, poet Allen Ginsberg, novelists Alfred Kazin and Brendan Gill, director Martin Scorsese, journalist Pete Hamill, former Congresswoman Bella Abzug, historian Niall Ferguson, philosopher Marshall Berman, writer Fran Lebowitz, engineer Leslie E. Robertson, architect Robert A.M. Stern, high wire artist Philippe Petit, real estate developer (and future President) Donald Trump, and author David McCullough.

Production and release

In 1987, Ric Burns and James Sanders conceived the idea of a multi-part television series on the history of New York City. In 1993, Burns, having completed The Way West two years earlier, collaborated with Sanders and Lisa Ades to win a grant from the NEH, and he and Sanders began writing the script for New York. Lisa Ades and Steve Rivo assisted with the initial research. Thirteen joined the project soon after to complete fundraising. The cost of the series through Episode Five was $9.8 million, with more than 20 people involved with the series at its peak. The crew worked out of two offices near 72nd Street and Broadway, in New York City.

New sequences and imagery for New York were shot on 16mm film. The first half of the series was edited traditionally, but Burns reluctantly agreed to edit the second half digitally, on Avid workstations. In retrospect, Burns viewed the computer as an essential tool for managing the huge amount of archival material included in the film.

Originally, Burns planned for a 10-hour series. However, this plan was abandoned, and the first 10 hours (five two-hour episodes) told the story of New York City only up to 1931. The film up to this point was released in 1999, with plans to produce a sixth episode covering the remaining years. However, this plan, too, was abandoned in favor of two additional episodes, Episode Six (running 120 minutes) and Episode Seven (running 140 minutes). Both were released in September and October 2001, just weeks after the September 11th attacks.

Following the events of September 11, Burns, Sanders, and their team were inspired to produce an eighth episode of the film, focusing on the World Trade Center and its role in New York City's history.

Burns, Sanders, and Steeplechase Films are producing for broadcast a ninth episode of the series about contemporary New York City. The film will explore in dramatic detail how New York City has grappled on the local level with critical issues of immigration, diversity, growth, economic change, climate change, social justice and governance – issues that have become critical challenges around the globe. The film will demonstrate how the entire world is rapidly acquiring the characteristics of the modern city New York has pioneered for four hundred years – and that New York remains, as it nears the beginning of its fifth century as a metropolis, the pre-eminent and in most respects most successful urban laboratory on the planet: a place where the challenges and opportunities of modernity are confronted with an intensity and vision unparalleled in the world – and where the most critical human experiment on earth continues to unfold: the crucial, sometimes harrowing experiment, to see if all the peoples of the world can live together in a single place.

Episodes
The first five episodes aired in November 1999. Episodes Six and Seven aired in September and October 2001, respectively. A new episode, which chronicled the rise and fall of the  World Trade Center, was produced after the September 11 attacks in 2001, airing in September 2003. In 2018, the ninth episode will premiere, chronicling New York since the events of September 11, 2001.

Reception
The original seven-part series was nominated for two Emmy Awards in 2000, for "Outstanding Achievement in Non-Fiction Programming - Cinematography" and "Outstanding Non-Fiction Series." In addition, Episode Five: Cosmopolis (1919–1931) won an Emmy for "Outstanding Achievement in Non-Fiction Programming - Picture Editing." Also in 2001, the five-part series won an Alfred I. duPont–Columbia University Award (Silver Baton) for excellence in broadcast journalism. In 2004, the newly completed Episode Eight: The Center of the World (1946–2003) was nominated for a News & Documentary Emmy in the "Outstanding Individual Achievement in a Craft: Music and Sound" category.

The film was well received by critics. In a 1999 review of the first five parts, Caryn James of The New York Times commended the film for its rich visuals, consistent theme, and compelling descriptions of class and racial tensions, especially in the second half of the series. James also criticized the film, however, writing, "Stunning though New York often is, its indulgent length and pace tests the patience of even its most serious-minded viewers."

Caryn James also reviewed the two new episodes released in late September 2001. She found them stronger than the previous five, with more focus and brevity. She also commented on the timeliness of their release following the September 11th attacks, finding the stories of the city's recovery from past disasters reassuring and full of accidental, yet profound meanings. A September 2003 review of the eighth episode in the series, by Alessandra Stanley of The New York Times, found it full of "intelligent insights and incomparable images," but ultimately, "too much, too late," like the World Trade Center itself.

Frank Rich of The New York Times referred to Episode 8 as, ""... a beautifully realized documentary in which we watch in painstaking detail the building of the World Trade Center from its inception so that we might then experience afresh the violence of its sudden destruction."

Popular audiences also displayed high interest for the film, with the first five parts alone attracting more than 20 million viewers.

VHS and DVD releases
This VHS is released November 23, 1999, 2 VHS and DVD on September 25, 2001, and Episode 8 on VHS and DVD on September 30, 2003.

See also
 History of New York City

References

Further reading
 Burns, Ric, and James Sanders. New York: An Illustrated History (2003), book version of 17 hour Burns PBS documentary, "NEW YORK: A Documentary Film"

External links
New York A Documentary Film Online

1999 television films
1999 films
American Experience
American television films
Television series by WNET
Television series by WGBH
PBS original programming
Documentary films about New York City
Films directed by Ric Burns
History of New York City
Triangle Shirtwaist Factory fire
1999 American television series debuts
2003 American television series endings